Terminalia ferdinandiana, most commonly known as the Kakadu plum and also called the gubinge, billygoat plum, green plum, salty plum, murunga, mador and other names, is a flowering plant in the family Combretaceae, native to Australia, widespread throughout the tropical woodlands from north-western Australia to eastern Arnhem Land. Used as a traditional bush food and bush medicine for centuries, the fruit has especially high levels of vitamin C.

Description
The flowers are small, creamy-white, perfumed, and borne along spikes in the leaf axils towards the ends of the branches. Flowering is from September to December or February (Southern hemisphere spring/summer).

They ripen from March onwards, with the ripe fruits being very pale, sometimes pinkish.

The species epithet "ferdinandiana" was created by A.W. Exell in honour of the first European botanist to collect and describe Kakadu plum, Ferdinand Mueller, who had originally given the species the nomen illegitimum (illegitimate name), Terminalia edulis.

Range and habitat
The tree is widespread throughout the tropical woodlands from northwestern Australia to eastern Arnhem Land. It is found along the coast in the Kimberley region of Western Australia as far west as Broome extending east into the Northern Territory where it is found mostly in the western portion of the top end from the Western Australian border to Arnhem Land but is found as far east as Limmen National Park.

It grows in a variety of habitat including sandplains, floodplains, creek beds, ridges, among vine thickets and on the edges of areas of mangroves. It grows in sandy, peaty or clay soils around sandstone or ironstone, and is often found as part of eucalypt communities.

Ecology
The Kakadu plum provides food for important small mammals such as possums, rock rats, tree rats, and bandicoots. Since demand has increased for the fruit for human consumption, careful management is necessary to ensure its sustainability.

Uses

Traditional uses
The fruit has been used as bush tucker or traditional medicine by Aboriginal Australian people over centuries.

The tree is particularly valued as a medicine by the Aboriginal peoples of the region, who use the inside of the bark for treating various skin ailments and infections. Fungal infections such as ringworm and bacterial infections (including leprosy) are other targets of treatment.

Nutritional value
The Kakadu plum has a high concentration of vitamin C in its fruit: recorded concentrations of 2300–3150 mg/100 g wet weight and occasionally as high as 5300 mg/100 g, compared with 50 mg/100 g for oranges, making it among the highest known of any natural source. It also contains a high oxalic acid content that may have toxicity when consumed.

Taste and modern uses
Kakadu plums taste "somewhat bland, but with a definite sour and astringent finish", sometimes salty. Its taste makes it suitable for making into jam, sauces and relishes.

Based on studies done by University of Queensland Centre for Nutrition and Food Sciences researchers over a decade, the fruit has been used as a preservative to maintain the freshness of prawns and frozen foods.

Because of its potential for varied uses as a food, cosmetic ingredient or preservative, there has been a need to manage its growth in the wild, and in addition, efforts have been made to involve Indigenous groups in the growing industry. The Northern Territory Government has created a five-year (2019–2023) management plan "to ensure wild populations of this native plant and its habitat are adequately maintained across the Northern Territory well into the future".

In Aboriginal languages

Northern Territory
In Kundjeyhmi, the language of Kakadu National Park where the English name "kakadu plum" originates, the fruit and tree are called anmarlak. In the closely related Kunwinjku language of West Arnhem Land, the word is manmorlak, or mandjiribidj in the Kuninjku dialect. In Yolŋu it is called ŋäṉ'ka-bakarra.  The name murunga comes from an eastern Arnhem language.

Western Australia
In the languages of the Kimberley, Western Australia, the tree is known as gubinge (from the Bardi language) mardorr, yuminyarri and jambalbeng.

References

Flora of the Northern Territory
Rosids of Western Australia
fernandiana
Trees of Australia
Myrtales of Australia
Kakadu National Park
Plants described in 1935